is a Japanese visual novel publishing company founded by Takumi Nakazawa. The company name comes from an Italian word meaning film director, control tower, producer, and game maker. The company mainly ports adult game to the consumer port PlayStation 2. In 2006, Regista published their first original game named I/O by GN Software, and in 2007 published their second original game called Myself ; Yourself by Yeti.

Games published
Aria the Natural: Tōi Kioku no Mirage
H2O +
I/O
I"s Pure
Izumo 2: Gakuen Kyōsōkyoku Double Baton
Koihime † Musō
Con Neko: Keep a Memory Green
Life Like an hour
Myself ; Yourself
Root Double: Before Crime * After Days
Saint Beast: Rasen no Shō
School Days L×H
Secret Game: Killer Queen
Sekai no Subete: Two of Us
Sharin no Kuni, Himawari no Shōjo
Tamayura: Mitama Okuri no Uta
Teikoku Sen Senki

External links
Regista's official website

References

Amusement companies of Japan
Video game companies of Japan